Quarryville is an unincorporated community located within Wantage Township in Sussex County, New Jersey, United States.

The settlement is located on Quarryville Brook, a tributary of the Wallkill River.

By 1882, "Quarry Station" was located in the settlement, part of the New Jersey Midland Railway, which later became the New York, Susquehanna and Western Railway.  A post office was located there, and the population was 64.  The settlement was described as having "a large local trade, a good shipping trade, and quarries of superior building stone".

References

Wantage Township, New Jersey
Unincorporated communities in Sussex County, New Jersey
Unincorporated communities in New Jersey